The 2013 Tatarstan Open was a professional tennis tournament played on outdoor hard courts. It was the fourth edition of the tournament which was part of the 2013 ITF Women's Circuit, offering a total of $50,000+H in prize money. It took place in Kazan, Russia, on 26 August–1 September 2013.

WTA entrants

Seeds 

 1 Rankings as of 19 August 2013

Other entrants 
The following players received wildcards into the singles main draw:
  Elizaveta Kulichkova
  Polina Novoselova
  Evgeniya Rodina
  Sabina Shaydullina

The following players received entry from the qualifying draw:
  Ekaterina Alexandrova
  Anastasia Frolova
  Anastasiya Saitova
  Anastasiya Vasylyeva

Champions

Singles 

  Anna-Lena Friedsam def.  Marta Sirotkina 6–2, 6–3

Doubles 

  Valentyna Ivakhnenko /  Kateryna Kozlova def.  Başak Eraydın /  Veronika Kapshay 6–4, 6–1

External links 
 Official website 
 2013 Tatarstan Open at ITFtennis.com

2013 ITF Women's Circuit
2013 in Russian tennis
2013 Tatarstan Open
2013 Tatarstan Open